Marjorie June Taylor (December 14, 1917 – May 16, 2004) was an American choreographer, best known as the founder of the June Taylor Dancers, who were featured on Jackie Gleason's various television variety programs.

Early life and career
Taylor was born in Chicago, the daughter of Percival Guy Taylor and Angela Taylor. She started taking dance lessons at age eight; by age 14, she lied about her age and became one of the dancers at the Chicago nightclub, Chez Paree. At age 19, she was touring the US and Europe as a dancer in various nightclubs. She returned from London and began performing again in Chicago. In 1938, at age 21, Taylor collapsed on stage, ill with tuberculosis; she spent the next two years in a sanitarium,  after which she turned to choreography, founding her own dance troupe in 1942, which made its first professional appearance at Chicago's Blackhawk restaurant.

In 1946, Taylor met Jackie Gleason at a Baltimore nightclub. The two became friends when Taylor helped Gleason overcome a case of stage fright. In 1948, Taylor made her television debut on The Toast of the Town starring Ed Sullivan, where six of her original dancers appeared as The Toastettes, bringing the chorus line to television. Two years later, Taylor joined Gleason's Cavalcade of Stars, and followed him, along with 16 dancers, to The Jackie Gleason Show, where her signature was the overhead camera shot of the dancers making kaleidoscopic geometric patterns.

Taylor was initially dubious about joining Gleason on his DuMont Network show because it meant signing a long-term contract; her husband, Sol Lerner, suggested she take the offer. The high-kicking, smiling routines that formed the first three minutes of each broadcast were Broadway-based and reminiscent of The Rockettes. In addition to Gleason's show, the June Taylor Dancers also made appearances at the General Motors "Motorama" auto shows in New York and Boston and on Stage Show. Gleason and Taylor also worked together to produce a television ballet, Tawny, in 1953; the music was done by Gleason and the choreography by Taylor.

Taylor won an Emmy Award for choreography in 1955.  Mercedes Ellington, granddaughter of Duke and daughter of Mercer, became the group's first and only African-American dancer in 1963. In a Dance Magazine article after Taylor’s death, Mercedes Ellington emphasized Taylor’s role as a mentor in her career, saying that “she looked after me.” In 1965, the June Taylor Dancers added male performers to the troupe.

In 1978, Taylor, who lived in Fort Lauderdale, Florida after Gleason moved production of his show from New York to Miami Beach, began choreographing the Miami Dolphins cheerleading squad, the Dolphin Starbrites, and served in this capacity until 1990. The Starbrites, famous for their one-piece bathing suits and go-go boots, performed Broadway-style halftime shows.

The June Taylor Dancers 
The June Taylor Dancers, the group of sixteen female dancers that performed Taylor’s choreography on The Jackie Gleason Show, was an incredibly talented group of women who produced an immense body of work and had a profound impact on the development of tap dance as an art form through the 1950s and 1960s. At this time, tap dancers were struggling to find work as the public lost interest in tap and the professional dance economy collapsed. This so-called “death of tap” occurred for a variety of reasons, including new styles of music like bebop and rock and roll, musicals such as Oklahoma! bringing ballet to the Broadway stage, laws taxing cabaret performances, and the growing ubiquity of television in people’s homes.

The complexity and excitement of a live tap performance simply did not translate to the small television screens. Blurry, pixelated screens and crude camerawork meant that the nuances of the movement were lost, and a dance form as specific and precise as tap suffered the most. This required stylistic innovation, with choreography that focused more on the larger shapes of the body instead of the intricate rhythms of the feet, so that it would appear dynamic on a small screen. Additionally, while professional dancers could previously perform the same routines again and again, television required an entirely new routine week after week. June Taylor took this in stride, telling The New York Times that “one of the first things I learned in television was the necessity of varying the style of the dancing each week … people want something new.” Taylor’s choreography does show a remarkable amount of variety, both within a single dance to keep viewers entertained and from week to week.

One dance from the April 21, 1956 episode, titled “Bumble Boogie,” features a 13-year-old violin prodigy playing live while the dancers in bumblebee costumes spin and tap around him. The dance features a range of steps from classical ballet pique turns and saut de basques to popular lindy hop and Charleston steps. The formational changes are complex, and the movement is all very precisely timed, requiring an immense amount of rehearsal in just one week. Other dances they performed on the show involve complex tap dance sequences, kicklines, and even twirling and throwing hula hoops. They often involve June Taylor’s signature overhead kaleidoscopic Busby Berkeley-esque shots, in which the dancers lie on the floor in a circle and move their legs to create different shapes together, an effect that could not be produced in a traditional stage setting. Due to the specific demands of television, the expectations of dancers changed, and it seems that those expectations became much harder to fulfill, as many dancers were not able to keep up. This emphasizes the unique hard work and success of June Taylor and her dancers, as they stepped up to fill the new roles created by the medium of television.

Personal life
June Taylor married attorney Sol Lerner; the couple had no children. Her sister, and sometime dance partner, Marilyn Taylor Horwich, became Jackie Gleason's third wife in 1975.

Death
June Taylor died on May 16, 2004 in Miami, Florida from natural causes, aged 86. She is buried in Our Lady of Mercy Catholic Cemetery in Miami, near Gleason's outdoor mausoleum.

In popular culture
The character June from Playhouse Disney's Little Einsteins is named after her as an honor.
On May 9, 2000, Taylor was interviewed by the Academy of Television Arts & Sciences Foundation's Archive of American Television. This interview can be seen at the Archive's website.
In 2001, Taylor was featured on episodes of A&E's TVOGRAPHY, a program about America's favorite TV shows.

Credits
Ed Sullivan's Toast of the Town - 1948
Jackie Gleason's Cavalcade of Stars - 1950
The Jackie Gleason Show - 1952-1959 and 1962–1970
Stage Show - 1955-1956
 What's My Line? - 1956

References
Notes

External links

Watch
June Taylor Interview Seven part interview at Academy of Television Arts and Sciences Foundation.

1917 births
2004 deaths
American female dancers
Dancers from Illinois
Dancers from Florida
American choreographers
Primetime Emmy Award winners
Artists from Chicago
Artists from Miami
20th-century American dancers
20th-century American women
21st-century American women